Breg is a settlement on the right bank of the Dravinja River in the Municipality of Majšperk in northeastern Slovenia. The area is part of the traditional region of Styria. It is now included with the rest of the municipality in the Drava Statistical Region.

History

The place has a very rich history, as the Wool Products Factory and Konus Planika operated there. The place also had its own power plant in the past, owned by Marija Kubricht.

Cultural heritage
A Baroque mansion in the settlement, known as Hamre Castle, was built in 1735.

References

External links
Breg at Geopedia

Populated places in the Municipality of Majšperk